Myths to Live By is a 1972 book, a collection of essays, originally given as lectures at the Cooper Union Forum, by mythologist Joseph Campbell between 1958 and 1971. The work has an introduction by Johnson E. Fairchild.

The deep power of myth on the inner, spiritual lives of human beings throughout the ages (including our own age) is the common theme running throughout all the essays in the collection. Campbell explains the differences between western and oriental myths and rites. He shows how fundamental universal thoughts are adapted to local requirements of legitimation. A typical form of adaptation of the hero is the American image of the lone rider who dispels evil.

Publication history
 Viking Press, New York, 1972, 
 Paladin Press, London, 1985, 
 Bantam Books, New York, 1988, 
 Penguin Books, Australia, 1993, 
 Souvenir Press, London, 2000, 
 Joseph Campbell Foundation, 2011, (ebook)

References

External links
 Summary from the Joseph Campbell Foundation

Books by Joseph Campbell
1972 books
Mythology books
Religious studies books
Philosophy books
Sociology books
Viking Press books